The Anglican Diocese of Oke-Ogun is one of 17 within the Anglican Province of Ibadan, itself one of 14 provinces within the Church of Nigeria. The current bishop is Cornelius Adagbada.

Notes

Church of Nigeria dioceses
Dioceses of the Province of Ibadan